Abdallah bin Osama bin Mohammed bin 'Awad bin Laden (in Arabic: عبدالله بن أسامة بن محمد بن عوض بن لادن; born c. 1976) is the son of Osama bin Laden and Osama's first wife, a Syrian woman named Najwa.  He is not to be confused with Osama bin Laden's half-brother Abdullah bin Laden (born 1966) or the elder Sheikh Abdullah bin Laden, who died in 2002 at age 75.

World Assembly of Muslim Youth
In the 1980s, bin Laden was involved with the Annandale, Virginia offices of the World Assembly of Muslim Youth, an organization long suspected of terrorism links by the FBI.

Investigative reporter Greg Palast revealed shortly after the 9/11 attacks, that "On this unremarkable street, at 3411 Silver Maple Place, we located the former home of Abdullah and another brother, Omar, also an FBI suspect. It is conveniently close to WAMY. The World Assembly of Muslim Youth is in this building, in a little room in the basement at 5613 Leesburg Pike. And here, just a couple blocks down the road at 5913 Leesburg, is where four of the hijackers that attacked New York and Washington are listed as having lived."

Current activities
Bin Laden runs his own firm, Fame Advertising, in Jeddah. He is closely watched by the Saudi government, which has restricted his travel from the Kingdom since 1996.  Bin Laden, who reportedly has never disowned his father,
is known to dine occasionally with his father's half-brother, Saudi Binladin Group chairman Bakr bin Laden, at the Intercontinental Hotel in Jeddah.

According to a document leaked in 2015 by WikiLeaks, Abdallah had requested the United States embassy in Saudi Arabia for the death certificate of his father. The embassy, however, in a reply, told him that no death certificate was issued for Osama.

See also
 Bin Laden family

References

1970s births
Living people
Saudi Arabian businesspeople
Saudi Arabian people of Yemeni descent
Saudi Arabian people of Syrian descent
Abdallah
Year of birth missing (living people)